NNE1 (also known as NNEI, MN-24 and AM-6527) is an indole-based synthetic cannabinoid, representing a molecular hybrid of APICA and JWH-018 that is an agonist for the cannabinoid receptors, with Ki values of 60.09 nM at CB1 and 45.298 nM at CB2 and EC50 values of 9.481 nM at CB1 and 1.008 nM at CB2. It was invented by Abbott and has a CB1 receptor pEC50 of 8.9 with around 80x selectivity over the related CB2 receptor. It is suspected that metabolic hydrolysis of the amide group of NNE1 may release 1-naphthylamine, a known carcinogen, given the known metabolic liberation (and presence as an impurity) of amantadine in the related compound APINACA, and NNE1 was banned in New Zealand in 2012 as a temporary class drug to stop it being used as an ingredient in then-legal synthetic cannabis products. NNE1 was subsequently found to be responsible for the death of a man in Japan in 2014.

See also 
 5F-NNE1
 5F-PCN
 AM-2201
 APICA
 CUMYL-PICA
 FDU-NNE1
 JWH-018
 NM-2201
 SDB-005

References 

Designer drugs
Naphthoylindoles
Indolecarboxamides